The Kanada warehouses, also known as Effektenlager or simply Kanada, were storage facilities in the Auschwitz concentration camp in German-occupied Poland during the Holocaust. The buildings were used to store the stolen belongings of prisoners, mostly Jews who had been murdered in the gas chambers on arrival. The property of prisoners registered in the camp and used as slave labour was kept on deposit.

The warehouses became known as "Kanada" (or "Canada") because the prisoners saw them as the land of plenty. Although the name began as prisoner slang, it was apparently adopted by some of the camp administration. Prisoners who worked there were known as the Aufräumungskommando ("clearing-up commando") or Kanada Kommando. It was viewed as one of the best jobs in Auschwitz, because prisoners could "organize", in camp slang, and procure goods for themselves and other inmates.

Victims' belongings
From early 1942, when the mass gassing of Jews began, prisoners would bring belongings with them in the belief they were being resettled. They brought food, alcohol, household items, utensils, clothing, prams, medication, valuables, and professional tools, with their names, addresses and dates of birth on the luggage, all of which ended up in Kanada.

When they arrived at the camp, prisoners had to strip naked, either to be shaved and given camp clothes or to be gassed. From around 1942, the belongings of murdered Jews, Poles, French citizens, the Roma and Soviet citizens and POWs were regarded as the property of Germany, which meant the camp made no attempt to pass it to the next of kin. The goods were sorted and packaged by the Kanada Kommando, appointed from among registered prisoners who had been admitted to the camp as workers. The goods were then used in the camp itself or sent elsewhere, including to Germany.

The first warehouses, Kanada I, were originally in block 26 of Auschwitz I, the main camp in the complex, but were expanded in December 1943 to Kanada II, 30 wooden buildings near the gas chambers in the BIIg section of Auschwitz II-Birkenau, the extermination camp. There were also two barracks for the Kanada Kommando and one for the SS who worked there. At the beginning of 1944 two Italian young women also worked in Kanada. They arrived with a transport from north Italy. On 22 July 1944, 210 male prisoners worked in Kanada I and 590 in Kanada II; on 2 October that year, 250 female prisoners worked in Kanada I and 815 in Kanada II. Later 1,500–2,000 worked in Kanada II.

Liberation
On 23 January 1945, during the evacuation of the camp as the Red Army approached, the SS set Kanada II on fire, along with the crematoria and gas chambers. Apparently, the warehouses burned for five days, destroying everything except for spoons and other utensils, although items belonging to victims were found in other warehouses in Auschwitz I.

See also
 Auschwitz Album

Citations

Bibliography

Further reading
 "Kanada". Auschwitz Album. Yad Vashem.
 "Kanada (Auschwitz)". United States Holocaust Memorial Museum.
 Auschwitz-Birkenau State Museum

External links 
 

Auschwitz concentration camp
The Holocaust
Warehouses